Pupatonia is a genus of minute sea snails, marine gastropod mollusks in the family Eatoniellidae, the eatoniellids.

Species
Species within the genus Pupatonia include:
 Pupatonia atoma Ponder, 1965
 Pupatonia gracilispira (Powell, 1933)
 Pupatonia magellanica Ponder & Worsfold, 1994
 Pupatonia minutula (Powell, 1933)
 Pupatonia pupinella (Finlay, 1927)

References

Eatoniellidae
Taxa named by Winston Ponder